Timothy Dale Cruickshank (born 19 May 1982) is a New South Wales cricketer. He is a right hand batsman and rarely bowls. He is a regular in the Manly-Warringah Waratahs (a Sydney Grade Cricket club) and made his debut for New South Wales in the 2010/11 Ryobi One Day Cup - a provincial cricket tournament in Australia. In his debut against Queensland at the Brisbane Cricket Ground on 29 October 2010, Cruickshank made 8 off 16 balls. He signed with the Sydney Thunder in the newly formed Big Bash League, playing three games for the team. Cruickshank has also played for New South Wales second XI and the New South Wales under 17 and 19s.

See also
 List of New South Wales representative cricketers

References

External links 
 Cricinfo. "Tim Cruickshank " Cricinfo. 30 October 2010.  (Retrieved 27 July 2011).

Living people
1982 births
New South Wales cricketers
Sydney Thunder cricketers
Australian cricketers